Qoreyshabad (also Romanized as Qoreyshābād) is a village in Fazl Rural District, in the Central District of Nishapur County, Razavi Khorasan Province, Iran. At the 2006 census, its population was 324, in 93 families.

References 

Populated places in Nishapur County